United Left (in Spanish: Izquierda Unida) was an alliance of leftist political parties in Peru founded in 1980 by Popular Democratic Unity (UDP), Revolutionary Left Union (UNIR), Peruvian Communist Party (PCP), Revolutionary Socialist Party (PSR), Revolutionary Communist Party (PCR) and FOCEP.

In 1984 UDP and a part of PCR converted itself into the Mariateguist Unified Party (PUM). PUM integrated itself in IU.

IU was led by Alfonso Barrantes Lingán (who lost to Alan García in the 1985 elections) up to 1987. In 1989 IU held its first congress.  Gradually the IU disintegrated, with more and more groups deserting it.
1980 establishments in Peru
Defunct left-wing political party alliances
Defunct political party alliances in Peru
Political parties established in 1980
Socialist parties in Peru
Peru